The Visherka is a river in Perm Krai, Russia, a right tributary of the Kolva. It flows out of Lake Chusovskoye in the north of the Cherdynsky District near its border with the Komi Republic. Its mouth is upstream of the uninhabited village of Bogatyryovo,  from the mouth of the Kolva. Its most significant tributaries are:
 Left: Larevka, Volim;
 Right: Shchugor

References

Rivers of Perm Krai